Wethautal is a Verbandsgemeinde ("collective municipality") in the Burgenlandkreis district in Saxony-Anhalt, Germany. Before 1 January 2010, it was a Verwaltungsgemeinschaft. It is situated along the small river Wethau, a tributary of the Saale, southeast of Naumburg. The seat of the Verbandsgemeinde is in Osterfeld.

The Verbandsgemeinde Wethautal consists of the following municipalities:

 Meineweh 
 Mertendorf 
 Molauer Land 
 Osterfeld
 Schönburg 
 Stößen
 Wethau

References

Verbandsgemeinden in Saxony-Anhalt